Millars' Karri and Jarrah Company (1902) Limited, commonly known as Millars, was a Western Australian focused timber and timber railway company.

Millars' Karri and Jarrah Forests Limited was a public company incorporated in London in July 1897 with its shares listed on the London Stock Exchange. Millars' was taken over by Bunnings Brothers Limited in 1983.

1902 amalgamation with other timber companies 

In 1902 an amalgamation of Western Australian timber companies saw Millars' Karri and Jarrah Company (1902) Limited formed from:
 Millars Karri and Jarrah Forests Limited (Mills at Denmark, Yarloop and Mornington)
 Jarrahdale Jarrah Forests and Railways Limited (Mill at Jarrahdale) 
 M. C. Davies' Karri and Jarrah Company Limited (mills at Karridale, Boranup and Jarrahdene)
 Canning Jarrah Timber Company
 Gill McDowell Jarrah Company (mills at Waroona and Lion Mill)
 Jarrah Wood and Saw Mills Company
 Jarrah Timber and Wood Paving Corporation (mills at Worsley)
 Imperial Jarrah Wood Corporation (mills at Newlands and Quindalup) 
 Swan Saw Mills
 Wilgarup Karri and Jarrah Company
 Sussex Timber company

Archives
 Battye Library has a collection of materials.

See also
Timber railway lines of Western Australia
Yarloop Workshops

Notes

References

Timber companies of Western Australia
Economic history of Western Australia
Defunct forest products companies of Australia